Clement Reginald "Clem" Splatt (17 September 1899 – 18 August 1963) was an Australian rules footballer who played with Collingwood and Hawthorn in the Victorian Football League (VFL).

Family
The son of Henry Bartlett Splatt (1863–1938), and Mary Ann Splatt (1871–1937), née Ely, Clement Reginald Splatt was born at Greensborough, Victoria on 17 September 1899.

He married Annie Doris Vera Jack (1905–1955) in 1926. They had two children: Valma Beryl Splatt (1927–1959), later Mrs. Albert Clack, and John Robert Henry Splatt (1932–1997).

Football
A very tall player for his era, Splatt was a key position player who was noted for his marking.

Diamond Creek
Splatt commenced his football career at Diamond Creek Football Club where he played with Gordon and Syd Coventry.

Collingwood (VFL)
Clem and Syd joined Gordon at Collingwood for the 1922 VFL season, but Splatt only managed two games.

Hawthorn (VFA)
In 1923 he transferred to Hawthorn, who were then in the Victorian Football Association (VFA).

Hawthorn (VFL)
He continued playing for Hawthorn as they joined the VFL in 1925 and, playing at centre half-forward, was a member of their inaugural VFL side, which played against Richmond, at Glenferrie Oval, on 2 May 1925. Splatt was Hawthorn's leading Brownlow Medal vote winner (with three) in 1925.

Injuries limited him to a further five games over the next two seasons and he retired from senior football.

Hastings
In 1929 Splatt took a position as captain-coach of the Hastings Football Club (replacing the team's 1928 coach, ex-Fitzroy footballer Bill Thorpe) where he played for four years.

After football
He subsequently took a position on the committee of the Alexandra Football Club.

Death
Clem Splatt died at East Melbourne on 18 August 1963 and is buried at Springvale Botanical Cemetery.

Footnotes

References

External links 

 
 
 Clem R. Splatt, at The VFA Project.
 Clem Splatt, at Collingwood Forever.

1899 births
1963 deaths
Collingwood Football Club players
Hawthorn Football Club (VFA) players
Hawthorn Football Club players
Diamond Creek Football Club players
Greensborough Football Club players
Australian rules footballers from Melbourne
People from Greensborough, Victoria